Niedermeier is a German surname. The name was initially used as a distinguishing name for a farmer (Meier) who had a farm lower (nieder) than the neighboring one(s). Variants are Niedermaier, Niedermair, Niedermayer, Niedermayr, Niedermeier, Niedermeir, Niedermeyer and Niedermeyr. These names are common to Austria and Bavaria.

Notable people with the surname Niedermaier include:
 Judith E. Niedermaier (1939–2011), American designer and businesswoman
 Tobias Niedermaier (*1989), German epidemiologist

Notable people with the surname Niedermeier include:
 Georg Niedermeier, German footballer

 Notable people with the surname Niedermayer include:
 Inge Niedermayer, Austrian rower
 Kurt Niedermayer, German footballer
 Luděk Niedermayer, Czech politician and economist
 Oskar von Niedermayer (1885–1948) German general, professor and adventurer
 Rob Niedermayer (born 1974), Canadian ice hockey player (brother of Scott)
 Scott Niedermayer (born 1973), Canadian ice hockey player (brother of Rob)
 Thomas Niedermayer, German industrialist kidnapped and killed by the Provisional IRA

 Notable people with the surname Niedermeyer include:
Helmut Niedermeyer (1926–2014), Austrian businessman
Louis Niedermeyer (1802–1861), Swiss-born French composer

 Notable people with the surname Niedermayr include:
Gerhard Niedermayr, see Niedermayrite mineral
Helmut Niedermayr (1915–1985), Formula One driver 

 Notable people with the surname Niedermair include:
 John Niedermair (1893–1982), naval architect
 Roland Niedermair, luger

See also
 Neidermayer's Mind, a demo by alternative metal band Korn
 Niedermayer–Hentig Expedition

German-language surnames